The Kubrawiya order or Kubrawi order, also known as Firdawsiyya, is a Sufi order that traces its spiritual lineage (Silsilah) to the Islamic prophet, Muhammad, through Ali, Muhammad's cousin, son-in-law and the First Imam. This is in contrast to most other Sufi orders that trace their lineage to Ali. The Kubrawiya order is named after its 13th-century founder Najm al-Din Kubra, who lived in Konye-Urgench under the Khwarazmian dynasty (present day Turkmenistan). The Mongols captured Konye-Urgench in 1221 and killed much of the population including Sheikh Najmuddin Kubra.

The Kubrawiya order places emphasis on being a universal approach.
It is popular in eastern India, Bangladesh and Mauritius and some areas of Pakistan as well.

Branches 
Mir Sayyid Ali Hamadani was the second founder of the Kubrawiyyah order and expanded in parts of today's India, Pakistan, Bangladesh, China, and Central Asian countries in the 14th century. In Iran the Kubrawiya order was split into branches after Khwaja Ishaq Khatlani succeed the founder. Eventually, differences within the order had arisen between the two claimants to succeed the leadership in which one group called themselves the Nurbakshia group comprising the supporters of Nurbaksh while the other group supported Barzish Abadi who was based in Mashhad.
The Noorbakshia are seen in areas small population in Baltistan. The other attributed to Syed Abdullah Barzish Abadi and it spread  first in  Khorasan, then spread in other countries.

Notable Kubrawiya
Najm al-Dīn Rāzī Dāya (1177–1256)
Saʿd al-Dīn al-Ḥamuwayī (1190–1260)
Sayf al-Dīn Bākharzī (1190–1261)
Emīr Sulṭān (1368–1429)
Ḥamza Makhdūm (1495–1576)

References

Further reading
 Encyclopædia Iranica: Kobrawiya - The Order

External links
 The Kubrawi order (kubrawi.org)
The Kubravi order
Sufia Imamia Noorbakhshia
 Website of Dr. Alan Godlas (University of Georgia)
 Maktab Tarighat Oveyssi Shahmaghsoudi (Nurbakhshi Kubrawi)

Sufi orders